This is a table chart of the current police chiefs of Afghanistan. Like provincial governors and deputy governors, police chiefs are all appointed by the Emir of Afghanistan.

Police Chiefs

See also
 List of current provincial governors in Afghanistan
 List of current provincial deputy governors in Afghanistan
 List of current provincial judges in Afghanistan

References

Police Chiefs
Police Chiefs of Afghanistan
People of the Islamic Republic of Afghanistan